Botanical gardens in Ukraine have collections consisting entirely of Ukraine native and endemic species; most have a collection that include plants from around the world. There are botanical gardens and arboreta in all states and territories of Ukraine, most are administered by local governments, some are privately owned.

 Dniepropetrovsk Botanic Garden Dniepropetrovsk
 The State University Botanical Garden Dniepropetrovsk
 Dokuchaevsk botaniсal gardens Dokuchaevsk Donestky region
 , Donetsk Donetsk region
 Botanical Garden Podolski State Agricultural and Technical University Kamenetz-Podolsk Khmelnitsky Region
 Kharkiv National Pedagogical University Botanic Garden Kharkiv Kharkiv oblast
 , Kharkiv Kharkiv oblast
 Agricultural and Biological Station and Botanical Garden Of Kherson State University Kherson
 The Botanical Garden Khorostkov Ternopol'skot Region
 Botanic Garden of the М. G. Kholodny Institute of Botany Kyiv
 Botanical Garden of National University of Life and Environmental Sciences of Ukraine Kyiv
 Catalogue of Medicinal Plants of Ukrainian Botanic Gardens and Parks Kyiv Kyiv oblast
 Catalogue of Rare Plants of Ukrainian Botanic Gardens and Parks Kyiv Kyiv oblast
 (M.M. Gryshko) Hryshko National Botanical Garden, Kyiv
 O.V. Fomin Botanical Garden Kyiv Kyiv oblast
 Krivorozhskiy Botanical Garden of Ukrainian National Academy of Sciences Krivoy Rog
 Kremenets Botanical Garden
 Botanic garden of Lviv National Medical University Lviv
 , Lviv
 Ukrainian National Forestry University Botanic Garden Lviv
 Botanic gardens of Luhansk Taras Shevchenko National University Luhansk Luhanskaya oblast
 Botanical Garden Lutsk Lutsk
 Carpathian Forest Research Station Mukachenko
 The Botanical Garden of the Pedagogical Institute Nezhin
 Botanical Garden of Odessa National I.I.Mechnikov University, Odessa
 Botanic Garden of Poltava National Pedagogical University Poltava Poltavs'ka oblast
 Botanical Garden of Tavrichesky University Simferopol Crimean Autonomous Republic
 Dendropark of Technical College of Forestry Storozhinets
 Botanical garden of Sumy State Pedagogical University "Makarenka" Sumy Sums'ka oblast
 Dendrological Park "Trostyanets" Trostyanets ICZN
 National Dendrological Park "Sofiyivka" NAS of Ukraine Uman Cherkassy
 The Botanical Garden Uzhgorod University Uzhgorod
 The Botanical Garden of Podolensis Vinnitsa
 Nikitsky Botanical Garden, Yalta, Crimea
 Children's Botanical Garden Zaporozhye
 The Botanical Garden of the Agricultural Institute Zhitomir

References 

Ukraine
Botanical gardens